The 2017 Vaahteraliiga season was the 38th season of the highest level of American football in Finland. The regular season took place between May 6 and August 27, 2017. The Finnish champion was determined in the playoffs, and at the championship game Vaahteramalja XXXVIII the Helsinki Roosters won their sixth consecutive championship, this time against the Wasa Royals.

Standings

Playoffs

References

American football in Finland
Vaahteraliiga
Vaahteraliiga